The Garcie Peaks are a group of three small peaks, the highest at , located  southeast of Mount Leo on the south side of Fleming Glacier, in the west-central Antarctic Peninsula. They were surveyed from the ground by the Falkland Islands Dependencies Survey in December 1958, and were named by the UK Antarctic Place-Names Committee after Pierre Garcie, a French sailor whose Le grand routier et pilotage (1483) was the first manual of sailing directions to include coastal recognition sketches.

References

Mountains of Palmer Land